Spider-Punk (Hobart Brown) is a superhero appearing in American comic books published by Marvel Comics. He is an alternate version of Hobie Brown and Spider-Man who opposes President Norman Osborn, V.E.N.O.M., and the Inheritors.

Spider-Punk is set to make his film debut in Spider-Man: Across the Spider-Verse, voiced by Daniel Kaluuya.

Publication history 
Spider-Punk first appeared in The Amazing Spider-Man #10 (January 2015), created by writer Dan Slott and artist Olivier Coipel. According to Slott, the original design of Spider-Punk was intended to be Spider-UK by Coipel, but Slott disapproved of him being Spider-UK, describing the character as "all punk". Slott, however, liked the design and help utilize the character for Coipel.

Fictional character biography

Spider-Verse
During the "Spider-Verse" storyline, the Earth-138 version of Spider-Man is revealed to be Hobart Brown, originally operating as Spider-Punk. He is a homeless teenager who was transformed by a spider that was irradiated as part of President Norman Osborn's toxic waste dumping. He becomes the punk-rock inspired Spider-Man, leading the downtrodden people of New York against Osborn's V.E.N.O.M. troops. Spider-Punk managed to kill Osborn during a riot by bashing the President with his guitar. After President Osborn's death, Spider-Punk unmasked himself to the viewing crowd as their savior. Spider-Punk was later recruited by Superior Spider-Man (Otto Octavius's mind in Peter Parker's body) to join an army of Spider-Men.

Spider-Geddon
During the "Spider-Geddon" storyline, Spider-Punk is shown to be fighting Thunderstrike while the other Web Warriors are dismantling Loomworld. Spider-Punk (who is starting to call himself Spider-Man) takes down Thunderstrike. When Spider-Punk states to Eric Masters to carry a message to the Red Skull about taking the Bowery, Eric is then reduced to a skeleton by Kang the Conglomerator who claims that he has the rights to his name in the future for his company KangCo. When Spider-Punk goes on the attack, Kang summons some Spider-Punk dolls to assist him. After fighting them, Spider-Punk gets away from them and asks for a tape from Captain Anarchy who is busy fighting the Annihilation Wave when they emerged in Harlem from the Negative Zone. When the Spider-Punk dolls catch up, they get into a fight with the Annihilation Wave where one of them eats the tape that Captain Anarchy was going to give to Spider-Punk. After getting the tape out of the insectoid's mouth, Spider-Punk is surprised when Kang catches up to him. As Captain Anarchy holds Kang off, Spider-Punk swings away. Meeting up with Robbie Banner, Hobie tries to convince him to help while reminding him of how he helped in battles against the U-Foes, the Universal Church of Truth, and Hydra. When Kang catches up again, Robbie plays the tape and becomes the Hulk to attack Kang. When Kang is defeated, he states that Captain Anarchy is not marketable and died old while Hobie died young. After Kang disappears with Hulk confused on what Kang meant, Spider-Girl shows up and states that something big is coming, and Spider-Punk agrees to go with her. Spider-Punk later visited an unnamed reality and saved the Norman Osborn version of Spider-Man from the collapsing Oscorp Tower. Seven months ago, Spider-Punk assisted Spider-Girl, Pavitr Prabhakar, Spider-UK, and Karn as the Master Weaver have been keeping a surveillance on the Inheritors as they send a Spider-Bot to Earth-3145 to check up on the Inheritors. Spider-Girl and Pavitr consider Spider-Punk to be the worst Spider-Man.

Spider-Punk is among the spider-powered characters that recruit Miles Morales to confront Superior Octopus when it was discovered that his cloning machine was made from the Inheritors' technology. They try to warn Superior Octopus, but it was too late as the Inheritors start to emerge as they kill Spider-Man Noir and Spider-UK. After the Inheritors emerge, Spider-Punk and Superior Octopus come up with a plan to kill the Inheritors. Spider-Punk informs the rest of Superior Spider-Man's group the bad news as Octavia Otto of Earth-1104 discovered that Solus lives again. As Miles Morales' group joins Superior Spider-Man's group in fighting the Inheritors, Spider-Punk notices that Jennix was driven insane and Verna is missing.

Banned in D.C
Spider-Punk’s first solo mini-series written by Cody Ziglar, art by Justin Mason finally fleshed out Earth-138 and gave a look at some characters of this universe. 
Spider-Punk and Captain Anarchy are seen fighting Kraven and the Hunters (Earth-138’s version of Kraven the Hunter). Soon after they head back to base and there we meet Riri Williams who goes by Riotheart. Hobie shows her a weapon that was left by Kraven and the Hunters that the two try and figure out its source. Captain Anarchy bursts in and tells the two that Kraven is attacking the base and to prepare to fight. A final battle unfolds and we get our first look at Riri’s Riot Heart armor. Kraven and the Hunters are subdued yet again when Spider-Punk and the gang try questioning him for clues about the weapons until a big explosion erupts. Out of the smoke steps, Ta$kmaster.

In other media

Television
Spider-Punk makes a cameo appearance in the Ultimate Spider-Man episode "Return to the Spider-Verse: Part 4", voiced by Drake Bell. This version speaks with a Cockney accent. He is among several alternate reality Spider-Men that the villainous Wolf Spider took hostage to siphon their powers before the "prime" Spider-Man, Kid Arachnid, and Spider-Woman arrive to save them.

Film
Spider-Punk is set to appear in Spider-Man: Across the Spider-Verse, voiced by Daniel Kaluuya.

Video games 
 Spider-Punk appears as an unlockable playable character in Spider-Man Unlimited.
 Spider-Punk's suit appears as an alternate skin for the titular character of Marvel's Spider-Man.
 Spider-Punk appears as an unlockable playable character in Marvel Strike Force''. This version is a member of the Web Warriors.

References

External links
 

African-American superheroes
Alternative versions of Spider-Man
Fictional characters from parallel universes
Incarnations of Spider-Man
Marvel Comics characters who can move at superhuman speeds
Marvel Comics characters with accelerated healing
Marvel Comics characters with superhuman strength
Marvel Comics mutates
Marvel Comics scientists
Spider-Man
Punk comics
Vigilante characters in comics